Harveyus is a genus of hubbardiid short-tailed whipscorpions, first described by Monjaraz-Ruedas, Prendini & Francke in 2019.

Species 
, the World Schizomida Catalog accepts the following three species:

 Harveyus mexicanus (Rowland, 1971) – Mexico
 Harveyus mulaiki (Gertsch, 1940) – US (Texas)
 Harveyus reddelli (Rowland, 1971) – Mexico

References 

Schizomida genera